Jazz Casual was an occasional series on jazz music on National Educational Television (NET), the predecessor to the Public Broadcasting Service (PBS).  The show was produced by Richard Moore and KQED of San Francisco, California. Episodes ran for 30 minutes.  It ran from 1961 to 1968 and was hosted by jazz critic Ralph Gleason.  The series had a pilot program in 1960. That episode, however, has been destroyed.  31 episodes were broadcast; 28 episodes survive.  Most episodes included short interviews with the group leaders.

Episodes

Video reissues
Rhino Records has reissued several performances from the series on DVD and videotapes.  In 2004, Efor Films released the entire series on an 8-DVD box set entitled The Complete Jazz Casual Series.

Notes

External links
 

1960s American music television series
1961 American television series debuts
1968 American television series endings
Music of the San Francisco Bay Area
Mass media in the San Francisco Bay Area
Jazz television series